was a Japanese professional golfer.

Professional wins

Japan Golf Tour wins
1973 Kansai Pro Championship
1974 Kansai Pro Championship, Tokai Classic
1976 Japan Open
1977 Kansai Pro Championship
1978 Fujisankei Classic
1979 Japan PGA East vs West Match
1981 Kuzuha Kokusai Tournament, Dunlop International Open

Other wins
1968 Japan PGA Championship, Grand Monarch
1970 Kansai Open
1975 Japan vs Great Britain and Ireland Match (Individual)
1979 Asahi Toy Kyosen Invitational
1984 Acom Team Championship (with Isao Isozaki)

Team appearances
World Cup (representing Japan): 1975, 1977

References

External links

Japanese male golfers
Japan Golf Tour golfers
Sportspeople from Hyōgo Prefecture
1944 births
2008 deaths